Whistlefield is a location just north of Garelochhead on the B872 in Dunbartonshire, Scotland.  There is a roundabout known locally as the "Whistlefield roundabout" on the A814 road. There is a viewpoint called the "Whistlefield viewpoint" with a picnic area and an associated carpark.

There is a modern housing development in the location, with the B872 called "Whistlefield Road" in the area.

Former railway station 

Whistlefield station on the West Highland Railway opened in 1896 and closed in 1964.

References

External links

Dunbartonshire